Jordan Pinder (born April 24, 1984) is a Canadian curler originally from New Brunswick. He now lives in Blockhouse, Nova Scotia.

Career
Pinder's father encouraged him to start curling. He has been curling since the age of 14, starting in his hometown of Miramichi.

Pinder has been part of Jamie Murphy's team since 2009. Murphy's team had a notable 2010 season, losing in the semifinal of the Nova Scotia Men's Provincial Championship that year.

In 2012 the team captured the provincial championship, defeating former Brier champion Mark Dacey. This earned Murphy's team their first trip to the Tim Horton's Brier.

Personal life
Pinder is self employed as a photographer, and he is also a post-doctoral fellow at Dalhousie University in the Pathology department. He is married to Vanessa Surette and has two children.

Teams

Notes

References

External links
 
 Grad student profile

1984 births
Living people
Canadian male curlers
Curlers from New Brunswick
Curlers from Nova Scotia
People from Lunenburg County, Nova Scotia
People from Miramichi, New Brunswick